Dichlorine hexoxide is the chemical compound with the molecular formula , which is correct for its gaseous state. However, in liquid or solid form, this chlorine oxide ionizes into the dark red ionic compound chloryl perchlorate , which may be thought of as the mixed anhydride of chloric and perchloric acids.
 
It is produced by reaction between chlorine dioxide and excess ozone:

2  + 2  → 2  + 2  →  + 2

Molecular structure

It was originally reported to exist as the monomeric chlorine trioxide ClO3 in gas phase, but was later shown to remain an oxygen-bridged dimer after evaporation and until thermal decomposition into chlorine perchlorate, Cl2O4, and oxygen. The compound ClO3 was then rediscovered.

It is a dark red fuming liquid at room temperature that crystallizes as a red ionic compound, chloryl perchlorate, . The red color shows the presence of chloryl ions. Thus, chlorine's formal oxidation state in this compound remains a mixture of chlorine (V) and chlorine (VII) both in the gas phase and when condensed; however by breaking one oxygen-chlorine bond some electron density does shifts towards the chlorine (VII).

Properties
Cl2O6 is diamagnetic and is a very strong oxidizing agent. Although stable at room temperature, it explodes violently on contact with organic compounds and reacts with gold to produce the chloryl salt . Many other reactions involving Cl2O6 reflect its ionic structure, including the following:

NO2F + Cl2O6 → NO2ClO4 + ClO2F
NO + Cl2O6 → NOClO4 + ClO2
2 V2O5 + 12 Cl2O6 → 4 VO(ClO4)3 + 12 ClO2 + 3 O2
SnCl4 + 6 Cl2O6 → [ClO2]2[Sn(ClO4)6] + 4 ClO2 + 2 Cl2
2Au + 6Cl2O6 → 2 + Cl2

Nevertheless, it can also react as a source of the ClO3 radical:

2 AsF5 + Cl2O6 → 2 ClO3AsF5

References

Chlorine oxides
Acidic oxides
Perchlorates
Chloryl compounds
Chlorine(V) compounds
Chlorine(VII) compounds